Licinius Valerianus Minor (died 268) was the son of Roman emperor Valerian and his second wife Cornelia Gallonia, and half-brother of Gallienus.

Life
In a nundinium sometime between 253 and 264 he was made suffect consul, and was appointed ordinary consul in 265. He died in the wake of his brother's assassination in the autumn of 268 when he was consul with his relative Marinianus, in a purge against Gallienus' partisans; Joannes Zonaras reported that he was killed at Rome, whereas Eutropius and the Historia Augusta state that he was murdered at Mediolanum.

Family tree of Licinia gens

References

268 deaths
3rd-century Romans
Ancient Roman murder victims
Imperial Roman consuls
Valerianus
Suffect consuls of Imperial Rome
Year of birth unknown
Sons of Roman emperors
Valerian dynasty